Fen may be either a Chinese female given name or family name. As a given name, it is represented in simplified Chinese as 芬 (pinyin: Fēn).

Fen may also be a surname in countries other than China, such as Uzbekistan where it is represented in Cyrillic as Фен.

Fen or Fenna is also an unrelated Frisian name.

Given name
 Yao Fen (b. 1967), Chinese badminton Olympic medal winner

Fen is also a part of the names of several other notable people, including:

 Lin Yan Fen (b. 1971), Chinese badminton Olympic medal winner
 Min Xiao-Fen (living), Chinese-American musician

Other
 Fen Cresswell (1915-1966), cricketer from New Zealand
 Fen McDonald, (1891–1915), Australian footballer
 Fen Osler Hampson

Surname
 Fen Yang (born 1982), Congolese table tennis player of Chinese origin

See also
 Fan (surname)

References

Fen
Fen
Unisex given names